A Guy, a Gal and a Pal is a 1945 American comedy-drama romance film directed by Budd Boetticher (as Oscar Boetticher Jr.) and starring Ross Hunter and Lynn Merrick.

Plot
A young woman devises a clever scheme to secure a train reservation by pretending to be married to a stranger.

Cast
 Ross Hunter as Jimmy Jones
 Lynn Merrick as Helen Carter
 Ted Donaldson as Butch
 George Meeker as Granville Breckenridge
 Jack Norton as Norton
 Will Stanton as Barclay

See also
 List of American films of 1945

References

External links

A Guy a Gal and a Pal at TCMDB

1945 films
American comedy-drama films
1940s English-language films
1945 comedy-drama films
American black-and-white films
Films directed by Budd Boetticher
1940s American films